Bonheur, impair et passe is a 1977 French television film directed by Roger Vadim starring Danielle Darrieux.

It was based on a play by Francoise Sagan.

Plot
Angora, a ruined Russian princess, is married to Igor, who, since she deceived him fifteen years ago, disdains her. When Wladimir arrives at her home, everything shatters.

Cast 
 Danielle Darrieux as Countess Deverine
 Ludmila Mikaël  as Angora
 Philippe Léotard as  Igor
 François Marthouret as  Wladimir
 Jean-François Balmer as Ladislas
  Roger Desmare as  Katov

External links

Films based on works by Françoise Sagan
French films based on plays
1970s French films